Freeze frame may refer to:

Film and television 
Freeze-frame shot, a cinematographic technique
Freeze frame television, a technique making use of freeze frame shots
Freeze Frame (The Price Is Right), a game on The Price Is Right
Freeze Frame (1979 film), a 1979 animated short directed by Chuck Jones
Freeze Frame (1992 film), a 1992 television film directed by William Bindley
Freeze Frame (2004 film), a 2004 film directed by John Simpson
Still frame, a single image ("frame") from a film or video

Music 
Freeze Frame (band), an English new wave band
Freeze Frame (Godley & Creme album), a 1979 album by Godley & Creme
Freeze Frame (The J. Geils Band album), a 1981 album by The J. Geils Band
"Freeze Frame" (song), a 1982 song on the above album

Other 
 Freeze Frame, a mini-game in Mario Party 6
 Freeze Frame, a novel written by Peter May (writer) in the Enzo series

See also
Freezeflame Galaxy, a fictional galaxy from the video game Super Mario Galaxy